Salvia aristata is a perennial, root stout, woody plant found in Iran and Turkey.

References

aristata
Flora of Iran
Flora of Turkey